University of Namibia's School of Medicine (better known as "UNAM School of Medicine") is a medical school of the University of Namibia. It was established in 2009 and graduated its first Namibian trained medical doctors in 2016.

The campus is located at the university's Hage Geingob Campus in Windhoek North close to the Windhoek Central Hospital where students do their referrals. It is the first and only medical school in Namibia.

History 
In 1992, the Government of Namibia engaged with multiple stakeholders to establish a medical school in Namibia.

Ten years later, in 2002, the WHO Regional Office for Africa appointed an expert to spearhead this initiative and laid the foundation from which to build up the school supported by strong political commitments. The Free University of Berlin and Oulu University of Finland have both demonstrated assistance in this exercise.

Years later, in 2008, preparations and various establishments were concluded. A feasibility study was conducted in March 2008 which finally recommended the establishment of the School of Medicine.

In 2009 the curriculum was finalised. The accreditation of the BPharm curriculum was approved by the HPCNA and the university Senate.

The school opened its doors for it first 55 medical students intake in 2010.

The department of Pharmacy was established in 2011 and the first intakes occurred in the same year.

The second President of the Republic of Namibia, Dr Hifikepunye Pohamba and the Founding Father Dr. Sam Nujoma, inaugurated the School of Medicine in 2012.

The school was registered with the NQA in 2012.

In 2016 the first graduates were released from the university.

A school of dentistry was established in 2018.

The UNAM School of Medicine programme has a population of about 380 students for its first five years of operation, including students from the wider SADC region.

Academic programmes 
The School of Medicine is accompanied by the School of Pharmacy, the School of Public Health and the newly added School of Dentistry. The university offers both undergraduate and postgraduate degrees.

Undergraduate 

 Bachelors of Medicine and Surgery (MBChB)
 Bachelors of Pharmacy Honours (BPharm)
 Bachelor of Dental Surgery (BChD)
 Bachelor of Physiotherapy
 Bachelor of Occupational Therapy

Postgraduate 

 Master of Pharmacy

References

University of Namibia
Medical schools in Namibia